The Andhra Pradesh Council of Ministers are elected legislative members, who are appointed as ministers by the Governor of Andhra Pradesh to form the executive branch of the Government of Andhra Pradesh. They hold various portfolios as decided by the Chief minister of Andhra Pradesh. The current state council of ministers is headed by Y. S. Jagan Mohan Reddy after the 2019 Andhra Pradesh Legislative Assembly election. The term of every executive wing is for 5 years.

The council of ministers are assisted by department secretaries attached to each ministry who are from IAS cadre. The chief executive officer responsible for issuing orders on behalf of Government is Chief Secretary to the State Government.

Constitutional requirement

For the Council of Ministers to aid and advise Governor 
According to Article 163 of the Indian Constitution,

This means that the Ministers serve under the pleasure of the Governor and he/she may remove them, on the advice of the Chief Minister, whenever they want.

The Chief Minister shall be appointed by the Governor and the other Ministers shall be appointed by the Governor on the advice of the Chief Minister, and the Minister shall hold office during the pleasure of the Governor:

Provided that in the States of Bihar, Madhya Pradesh and Orissa, there shall be a Minister in charge of tribal welfare who may in addition be in charge of the welfare of the Scheduled Castes and backward classes or any other work.

Chief Minister 

Like any Indian state, Chief Minister of Andhra Pradesh is the real head of the government and responsible for state administration. He is the leader of the parliamentary party in the legislature and heads the state cabinet.

Deputy Chief Minister 

Like any state, Deputy Chief Minister of Andhra Pradesh is the deputy head of the government and senior minister of cabinet after the Chief Minister.

State Cabinet 

As per Indian Constitution, all portfolios of state government is vested in Chief Minister, who distribute various portfolio to individual ministers whom he nominates to the State Governor. The state governor appoints individual ministers for various portfolios and departments as per advice of Chief Minister and together form the State Cabinet. As the original portfolios are vested with CM, who delegates to others upon his/her wish, actions of individual ministers are part of collective responsibility of the state cabinet and Chief Minister is responsible for actions of each minister. The state cabinet along with Chief Minister, prepares General policy and individual department policy, which will be guiding policy for day-to-day administration of each minister.

Past Ministries of Andhra Pradesh Government

References 

Government of Andhra Pradesh
State council of ministers of India